Seal Bay Conservation Park is a protected area located on the south coast of Kangaroo Island in the Australian state of South Australia. It is the home of the third largest Australian sea lion colony in Australia.

It is one of the most popular tourist destinations on Kangaroo Island. In order to protect the colony, visitors are only allowed on the beach by paying to go on a guided tour.

Description

Location
It is located within the gazetted locality of Seal Bay.

Extent
The conservation park is part of a group of protected areas extending along the coastline from the east end of Vivonne Bay in the west to the southern end of D'Estrees Bay in the east. It occupies several parcels of land which are bounded to the north in part by the South Coast Road by the West Bay Road and by the coastline in the south. It also includes Nobby Islet.	

A road named Seal Bay Road provides access to visitor facilities at Bales Beach in the east and overlooking the body of water known as Seal Bay in the west.

Protected area designation
The conservation park is classified as an IUCN Category VI protected area.

History
The sea lion population on Kangaroo Island had been exploited for economic purposes since the European colonisation. As sea lions were still being hunted as a source of shark bait post 1945, the Field Naturalists section of the Royal Society of South Australia wrote to the South Australian Museum in 1953 requesting that sea lions be given protection along the southern coast of Kangaroo Island. The request was also supported by both the South Australian Ornithological Association and the fledgling tourism industry on Kangaroo Island. A closed area for sea-lions extending from Nobby Islet to Cape Gantheaume was subsequently proclaimed under the Animals and Birds Protection Act 1946 at Seal Beach on 28 October 1954.

Organised tours commenced in 1955 as an initiative of a Kangaroo Island resident. As of 1969, six operators conveyed total of 7525 tourists to the reserve while ‘a large number of people visited the area with private and hire cars’. In 1974, the estimated annual visitation was between 25,000 and 30,000 people while in 1994 it was 70,000 people and as of the year 2014-15, it was 101,595.

On 27 April 1967, the reserve was re-dedicated as a fauna reserve under the Fauna Conservation Act 1964 along with the inclusion of two prohibited areas intended to protect the breeding area from interference. The reserve was also concurrently dedicated as a fauna conservation reserve under the Crown Lands Act 1929. 

In 1971, an aquatic reserve in the waters adjoining the Seal Beach foreshore was proclaimed under the Fisheries Act 1971 . In 1972, the reserve was again re-dedicated as the Seal Bay Conservation Park under the newly enacted National Parks and Wildlife Act 1972.

In 1980, the conservation park was listed on the now-defunct Register of the National Estate.

Associated protected areas
The Seal Bay Conservation Park is associated with three other protected areas which support the objectives of its management plan. These are the Seal Bay Aquatic Reserve, the Bales Beach Aquatic Reserve and the Southern Kangaroo Island Marine Park.

Gallery

See also
Protected areas of South Australia

Citations and references
Citations 

References

External links
Official webpage
Seal Bay Conservation Park webpage on protected planet

Conservation parks of South Australia
Protected areas established in 1967
1967 establishments in Australia
South Australian places listed on the defunct Register of the National Estate
Protected areas of Kangaroo Island